Leon Parker (born August 21, 1965 in White Plains, New York) is a jazz percussionist and composer. He is known for occasionally using a minimalist drum set with fewer components than usual, "sometimes consisting only of a snare drum, bass drum and a cymbal."

His 1998 album, Awakening (Columbia), reached the 20th position on Billboards "Top Jazz albums" chart. It was his second album for Columbia.

Parker played on pianist Jacky Terrasson's first three albums. Parker toured with guitarist Charlie Hunter, who commented that "What I always look for in drummers is that they have a perfect blend of the visceral and the intellectual [...] Leon definitely had that."

Discography

As leader
1994: Above & Below (Epicure)
1996: Belief (Columbia)
1998: Awakening (Columbia)
2001: The Simple Life (Label M)

Collaborations
1999: Duo with Charlie Hunter (Blue Note)

As sideman
With Dewey Redman & Joshua Redman
Choices (Enja, 1992)
With Jesse Davis
As We Speak (Concord Jazz, 1992)
Young at Art (Concord Jazz, 1993)
With MTB (Brad Mehldau, Mark Turner, Peter Bernstein)
Consenting Adults (Criss Cross Jazz, 1994)
With Jacky Terrasson 
Jacky Terrasson (Bluenote, 1994)
Reach (Blue Note, 1995)
Alive (Blue Note, 1998)
A Paris... (Blue Note, 2000)
With Don BradenOrganic (Epicure, 1995)
With James CarterThe Real Quiet Storm (Atlantic, 1995)
With Franck Amsallem and Tim Ries
 Is That So, Sunnyside Records 1996
With Virginia MayhewNini Green (Chiaroscuro, 1997)
With Giovanni MirabassiTerra Furiosa (Discograph, 2008)Out of Track (Discograph, 2009)
With Giovanni Mirabassi and Gianluca RenziLive At the Blue Note, Tokyo'' (Discograph, 2010)

References

American jazz drummers
Living people
1965 births
People from White Plains, New York
20th-century American drummers
American male drummers
Jazz musicians from New York (state)
20th-century American male musicians
American male jazz musicians